Brandon is a city in Minnehaha County, South Dakota, United States. Brandon is located five miles east of Sioux Falls. The population was 11,048 as of the 2020 census.

History
A post office called Brandon has been in operation since 1878. The city took its name from Brandon Township.

Geography
Brandon is located at  (43.591580, -96.580685), along the Big Sioux River and Split Rock Creek.

Demographics

As of the census of 2010, there were 8,785 people, 3,118 households, and 2,417 families residing in the city. The racial makeup of the city was 96.8% White, 0.6% African American, 0.5% Native American, 0.6% Asian, 0.3% from other races, and 1.2% from two or more races. Hispanic or Latino of any race were 1.2% of the population.

There were 3,118 households, of which 48.2% had children under the age of 18 living with them, 64.2% were married couples living together, 9.4% had a female householder with no husband present, 3.9% had a male householder with no wife present, and 22.5% were non-families. 18.5% of all households were made up of individuals, and 6.6% had someone living alone who was 65 years of age or older. The average household size was 2.82 and the average family size was 3.22.

The median age in the city was 32.9 years. 33.2% of residents were under the age of 18; 5.6% were between the ages of 18 and 24; 31% were from 25 to 44; 22.3% were from 45 to 64; and 7.8% were 65 years of age or older. The gender makeup of the city was 49.6% male and 50.4% female.

Parks and recreation
The Great Bear Recreation Park is located  miles to the west of Brandon on Rice Street.

The Big Sioux Recreation Area, a state recreation area consisting of a large forest surrounding the park's namesake Big Sioux River, is located west of Robert Bennis Elementary. It features many hiking and biking trails and bridges over the river, as well as camping sites and playgrounds.

Education
Students in Brandon are served by the Brandon Valley School District. As South Dakota allows parents to enroll their students at any school district, regardless of district boundaries, the school district also serves students from the surrounding areas.

The Brandon Valley School District currently operates one high school, one middle school, one intermediate school, and four elementary schools. Brandon Valley High School, Brandon Valley Middle School, Brandon Valley Intermediate School, Brandon Elementary School and Robert Bennis Elementary School are all located within Brandon's city limits, while Valley Springs Elementary School is located a few miles east of Brandon in Valley Springs, and Fred Assam Elementary School is located a few miles west, in eastern Sioux Falls.

In fall of 2015, the Brandon Valley School District added an intermediate school. The school is adjacent to Robert Bennis Elementary School and educates fifth and sixth grade students. Because the city's population had been increasing exponentially, district officials were concerned that Brandon Valley Middle School, which served grades 6–8, was reaching capacity. Voters living within the district voted to fund $5.95 million of the estimated $14 million required to build the school by way of property tax.

Infrastructure
Interstate 90, the longest interstate highway in the United States, is located along the city's northern border with Corson and serves as a major east–west route through the city. South Dakota Highway 11 (known as Splitrock Boulevard in the city limits) runs a north–south route as well. Most businesses in Brandon are located on Splitrock Boulevard. Other major roads include Holly Boulevard, Sioux Boulevard, and Aspen Boulevard. Aspen Boulevard directly connects Brandon to other communities to the east such as Valley Springs, South Dakota; Beaver Creek, Minnesota; and Luverne, Minnesota.

Major events
Since 2013, Automania, the largest free car show in the region, has taken place along Holly Boulevard in the summer. The event brought more than 70,000 people to Brandon when it took place in 2013.  AutoMania is now held 10 miles east, in Beaver Creek, Minnesota.

Notable people
Dale Moss – former football player and contestant on the 16th season of The Bachelorette.

References

External links
 City of Brandon official website
 Brandon Chamber of Commerce 

 
Cities in South Dakota
Cities in Minnehaha County, South Dakota
Sioux Falls, South Dakota metropolitan area